Firefall is an American rock band formed in 1974.

Firefall or Fire Falls, may also refer to:

Events
 Firefall (event), an ember dumping held at Yosemite National Park from 1872 until 1968
 Firefall, a phenomenon at Horsetail Fall (Yosemite) when the evening sun lights up the fall at a specific time of year
 Firefalls, a pre-Christian event, a flaming ball launch, part of the medieval festival Krakelingen and Tonnekensbrand, still celebrated in Geraardsbergen, Belgium

Literature
 Firefall (poetry), a 1993 collection of poetry by Mona Van Duyn
 Firefall (comics), a Marvel Comics fictional character, a supervillain from Rom the Space Knight
 Fire Falls, planet Kryton; a DC Comics fictional location 
 Firefall, a science-fiction series by Peter Watts consisting of Blindsight and  Echopraxia

Music
 Firefall (album), self-titled 1976 debut album
 "Fire Fall" (song), a 1998 song by 'The Residents' off the album Wormwood: Curious Stories from the Bible
 "Fire Fall" (song), a 1999 song by 'Mannafest' off the album Downpour
 "Fire Fall" (song), a 2019 song by 'Planetshakers' off the album Rain, Part 1

Videogaming
 Firefall (video game), a retired 2014 team-based action shooter developed by Red 5 Studios
 Firefall Bus, a custom promotional motorbus for the videogame created by West Coast Customs
 Firefall Arcade, a 1993 Macintosh game in the style of Centipede developed by Pangea Software
 Fire Falls, a fictional location from the videogame Drakensang: The Dark Eye

Other uses
 The Firefall, a 1904 silent film short
 Firefall (ride), a thrill ride at California's Great America
 Fire Falls (racehourse), the mother of U.S. racehorse Imbros

See also